Otocinclus hoppei is a species of catfish in the family Loricariidae. It is native to South America, where it occurs in the Amazon River basin. The species reaches 3.3 cm (1.3 inches) SL.

References 

Hypoptopomatini
Fish of South America
Fish described in 1939